Auberville is a commune in the Calvados department in the Normandy region of north-western France.

The inhabitants of the commune are known as Aubervillais or Aubervillaises.

Geography
Auberville is located on the northern Normandy coast some 8 km east by north-east of Cabourg and 13 km south-west of Deauville. Access to the commune is by road D513 from Houlgate in the west which passes through the village and continues north-east to Villers-sur-Mer. The D163 branches off the D513 in the village and goes south to Branville. Apart from the village there are the hamlets of Les Genets, Les Bruyeres, and Le Manoir. The north of the commune is forested along the coast with slopes down to the beach while the rest of the commune is farmland.

Toponymy
The name was attested in the form Osbertivilla in 1082. It came from the Germanic anthroponym Osbert or alternatively from the Scandinavian Osbern and the old French ville (from the Latin villa) in its original sense of "rural domain".

History
Archaeological excavations have found Merovingian tombs.

Administration

List of Successive Mayors

Demography
In 2017 the commune had 574 inhabitants.

Sites and monuments

 The Church of Sainte-Barbe, from the 13th century with a bell-gable.
 Falaises des Vaches Noires (the site of Chaos).
 The War memorial at Auberville commemorates the victims of the Franco-Prussian War of 1870, the First World War, and the Second World War.

Notable people linked to the commune
Paul Ernest Dupont (1816-1891), painter, he stayed at Villers and came to paint at Auberville
Pierre Ucciani (1851-1939), Corsican painter, he stayed at Cabourg and at Villers and came to paint at Auberville
Julien Turbiau (1876-1934), doctor and amateur painter, he stayed at Villers and came to paint at Auberville
Marie-Renée Ucciani, (1883-1963), painter and sculptor, she stayed at Villers and came to paint at Auberville
Claude Lelouch (born in 1937) director, producer, actor, screenwriter, he had a second home at Auberville

See also
Communes of the Calvados department

References

External links
Auberville on Géoportail, National Geographic Institute (IGN) website 
Auberville on the 1750 Cassini Map

Communes of Calvados (department)